The 1956 Pittsburgh Panthers football team represented the University of Pittsburgh in the 1956 NCAA University Division football season.

Schedule

Coaching staff

Team players drafted into the NFL

References

Pittsburgh
Pittsburgh Panthers football seasons
Pittsburgh Panthers football